Purple Drank is the latest release from Memphis rapper Indo G.

Track listing

References

External links 

 Purple Drank (album) on Spotify

2007 albums
Indo G albums